Eleonora Randolph Sears (September 28, 1881 – March 16, 1968) was an American tennis champion of the 1910s. In addition, she was a champion squash player, and prominent in other sports; she is considered one of the leading all-round women athletes of the first half of the 20th century.

Early life

Sears was the daughter of Boston businessman Frederick Richard Sears and a granddaughter of T. Jefferson Coolidge (who was a great-grandson of Thomas Jefferson) and Hetty Appleton, and a cousin of Henry Cabot Lodge. Sears' father was also known for playing the first tennis game in the United States, his opponent being his cousin James Dwight who brought the game from Europe.

Sears was raised in wealth and privilege. She was acquainted with Corinne Douglass Robinson, Eleanor Roosevelt and Alice Roosevelt, all related to President Theodore Roosevelt. She played tennis at a competition organized by Ava Lowle Willing, the wife of John Jacob Astor IV, and she attended the wedding of tennis champion Robert Wrenn. For a while she dated Harold Stirling Vanderbilt, the sporty scion of the Vanderbilt fortune.

Career
Sears won the women's doubles at the U. S. Women's National Championships four times, including three consecutively (1915–1917). In singles, she was a finalist in 1912, where she was beaten in straight sets by Mary Browne. She teamed with Willis E. Davis to take the national mixed doubles championship in 1916.

In August 1938 at the age of 56, she lost to Dorothy Bundy in the second round of the Essex County Club Invitational in Manchester, Massachusetts 6–0, 6–1.

She purchased the Burrland Farm for horses in 1955, then "deliberately gutted and burned [its mansion] down" in 1961 to reduce property taxes. She sold the farm in 1966.

She was inducted into the International Tennis Hall of Fame in 1968, joining her cousin Richard (inducted 1955).

Eleonora Sears rode horses competitively and was elected to the U. S. Show Jumping Hall of Fame in 1992. She also owned and raced Thoroughbred horses. She was the first woman to play polo on a men's team.

Sears was the first female national squash champion, a founder of the Women's Squash Racquets Association, and coach of the U. S. Women's International Squash Team.

She gained media attention for her long-distance walks and hikes. As well, she was one of the first American women to drive an automobile and fly a plane. Her habit of wearing trousers, both when competing in sports and in public, was criticized in media and social circles.

Grand Slam finals

Singles: 1 (1 runner-up)

Women's doubles: 5 (4 titles, 1 runner-up)

Mixed doubles: 2 (1 title, 1 runner-up)

Later life and death 
Later in life she lived in Florida with Marie V. Gendron (July 22, 1903 – January 26, 2004), nickname madame, who, at Sears' death, inherited her whole estate. She retained half of it, including Sears' house in Florida, jewelry and works of arts, and gave the rest to six Massachusetts hospitals.

See also 

International Tennis Hall of Fame

References

External links

 

 

1881 births
1968 deaths
American female tennis players
Appleton family
Sportspeople from Boston
International Tennis Hall of Fame inductees
Tennis players from Boston
United States National champions (tennis)
American female equestrians
American racehorse owners and breeders
Grand Slam (tennis) champions in women's doubles
Grand Slam (tennis) champions in mixed doubles